John Burnet Hall (also known as Atholl or JBH) is the smallest capacity Hall of Residence owned by the University of St Andrews. It was formerly the Atholl Hotel and is located in the town of St Andrews, Scotland. It has 76 bedrooms, of which 34 are shared, in the main building and 36 single, en-suite rooms in the annex. All rooms are catered, and meals are provided to residents 3 times a day Monday-Friday and breakfast and lunch are served on weekends. Prices for 2018–19 were £6,630 (single room,) £6,021 (shared room,) and £8,003 (single en-suite Annexe room.)

Naming 
The hall is named after the Scottish classicist, John Burnet.  It was formerly called the Atholl Hotel before it was purchased by the University of St Andrews.

Location 
John Burnet Hall is located on Links Crescent, which is at the end of A91 road. The hall overlooks the 18th hole of the St Andrews Links Old Course and the North Sea and West Sands can be seen from the building.

Facilities 
John Burnet Hall has four communal spaces; Front Hall - a meeting spot among the residents which has a couch and several chairs. The TV lounge offers seating and gaming facilities. West Lounge has a piano, seating and cushions, a pool table, a table tennis table, and a sound system projector and lights setup. 2018 saw the addition of the common room on the second floor of main building with views, a Nintendo Switch, chairs, and kitchenette facilities.

The laundry is serviced by provider, Washstation and the Wi-fi is provided by Eduroam. A drinks vending machine is in operation in the main building.

Traditions 
Due to John Burnet Hall's small size, its residents form a close-knit community each year.

Its traditional events include three annual balls: one held in north-east Fife's Fernie Castle at the beginning of the first semester, the Hall Ball towards the beginning of the second semester, and the Traditions Ball held near the end of the second semester, although, these balls were sporadic during the Covid-19 Pandemic.

The hall colours are green and blue, and the hall's official animal is a moose. 

The hall's traditional songs, chants, and traditions are generally taught to new residents within a week of their arrival in September in preparation for the annual 'Clan Warfare' event. Hall songs include the hall anthem John Burnet, La La La and Oh John Burnet is Wonderful (to the tune of When the Saints Go Marching In.) 

In addition, the hall maintains a form of rivalry with nearby University Hall. A rivalry which is referenced in the aforementioned Oh John Burnet is Wonderful.

References

External links 
 John Burnet Website
 John Burnet Arrivals
 Residence Page

University of St Andrews halls of residence
1898 establishments in Scotland